Ajinkya Deo is an Indian actor in Marathi films and is the son of veteran Marathi actor Ramesh Deo and Seema Deo. He is elder brother of Hindi film director Abhinay Deo. Vasudev Balawant Phadke was the latest Marathi film in which he was the lead. The film was released in December 2007.

Deo was also the executive director of Prabhat Entertainment TV channel. The channel operated from 2000 to 2002.

Deo acted in a Telugu horror film in the year 1996 directed by Ram Gopal Varma. Dev has anchored a crime show with Marathi entertainment channel Star Pravah.

Dev worked with Ajay Devgan in 1999 action movie Gair and 2020 historical action movie Tanhaji.

Filmography

References

External links

More pictures from Marathi Movies

Indian male film actors
Male actors in Marathi cinema
Living people
1963 births
Male actors in Marathi television